Fornos de Maceira Dão is a freguesia in Mangualde, Portugal. The population in 2011 was 1,459, in an area of 16.25 km2.

References

Freguesias of Mangualde